Face Behind the Face is the debut solo studio album from singer-songwriter Karl Wolf, first released in Canada.

Track list

2006 debut albums
Karl Wolf albums